The crying Izak (Holohalaelurus melanostigma) is a very rare catshark of the family Scyliorhinidae. It is found in the western Indian Ocean off Mozambique and Tanzania, at depths of between 600 and 660 m. It can grow up to 38 cm in length.

References

 Compagno, Dando, & Fowler, Sharks of the World, Princeton University Press, New Jersey 2005 

Holohalaelurus
Fish described in 1939